Margo Woode (April 20, 1928 – September 28, 2018) was an American actress, signed by 20th Century Fox in 1944 and started her film debut in Springtime in the Rockies (1942), as a bit player. Her best-known role was as Phyllis in Somewhere in the Night (1946). She married Hollywood personal manager Bill Burton on July 22, 1947, in Las Vegas, Nevada.

Filmography

References

External links
 
 

1922 births
2018 deaths
American film actresses
American television actresses
Actresses from Phoenix, Arizona
21st-century American women